Bismarck Henning High School or BHHS is a high school located in Bismarck, Illinois, and is currently hosting students from Rossville, Alvin, Bismarck, Henning, and parts of Danville. The school's demographics currently consist of 98% white students. The 2007 graduation rate was 86.2%. The drop-out rate in 2007 was about 1%, compared to the state average of 4%.  As of 2007, the school has 380 enrolled students and is one of the biggest schools in Vermilion County aside from Danville High School.

History
The school was originally named Township High School and had an athletic rivalry with Henning High School. Eventually, the school changed its name to Bismarck High School, and around the 1960s the Bismarck and Henning schools merged to create one Bismarck-Henning High School. In 2005, the local Rossville-Alvin High School shut down and students were given the choice to go to Bismarck or Hoopeston Area High School.
  Talk of this had been going on for a while, but eventually the Rossville school board had to cave in and decided to close the school for financial reason. Currently the majority of the students from Rossville attend BHHS, and because of this, prior to the move, the BHHS building received a major addition. In 2003, construction began on a new gymnasium, band room, and cafeteria. They also shut down the original and oldest part of the school. This part was originally the only part of Township High School, but rather than spend the money on bringing it up to code, they decided to tear it down and build a brand new wing of the school. The cafeteria, gymnasium, and band room were all completed before the 2004-2005 school year, and the new wing was completed shortly thereafter. In the 2006-2007 school year the school decided they needed a dean of students and promoted a middle school teacher, Rusty Campbell to this role. In the 2007-2008 school year, the school district switched the Jr. High and High School officials. The principal for the High School, Richard Decman, left the district, and the Jr. High School principal Scott Watson took over his chair. The dean of students, Rusty Campbell, then took over for the junior high principal.

Athletics
Bismarck is known primarily for its athletics. It hosts a wide arrange of sports and activities, and continue to bring in fans, alumni, and students to the events.

References

External links
Official Web Page
District Homepage
Football team site

Public high schools in Illinois
Bismarck-Henning High School
Educational institutions established in 1919
1919 establishments in Illinois